The Kettering Foundation is an American non-partisan research foundation founded in 1927 by Charles F. Kettering. The foundation publishes books and periodicals, employs research fellows, and organizes (through the National Issues Forums) public forums on policy in order to answer the question: "what does it take for democracy to work as it should?"  It is based in Dayton, Ohio.

The Kettering Foundation has played an active part in public policy, through for instance active support of the Dartmouth Conferences,

The foundation's current president and CEO since April 2022 is Sharon L. Davies. She succeeded  F. David Mathews who presided over the foundation from 1981 to 2022. Notable board members have included Lisle Carter, Jr.

Publications
The foundation publishes three periodicals:
Kettering Review, a journal on "subjects related to democracy, including the changing roles of the citizen, the press, public leadership, and public opinion."
The Higher Education Exchange, an annual publication intended as a forum about higher education for scholars and the general public.
Connections, an annual newsletter.

References

External links
Kettering Foundation website

Political and economic research foundations in the United States
Organizations established in 1927
Kettering, Ohio
Foundation, Kettering